The Venus Optics Laowa 105mm F2 Smooth Trans Focus lens is a smooth trans focus full-frame prime lens for Canon EF, Nikon AI, Sony A, Sony E, and Pentax K mounts, announced by Venus Optics in September 2016. It is marketed as the "Bokeh Dreamer" lens.

Though designed for full frame, the lens can be used on APS-C camera bodies, with an equivalent full-frame field-of-view of approximately 136.5mm - 157.5mm. Canon EF-Mount versions are optionally equipped with a focus confirmation chip.

Optical properties
The lens features an apodization filter element within the lens itself which lends itself to producing creamy smooth bokeh at the expense of light gathering capabilities. The lens features the bokeh of an f/2.0 lens but maintains the light-gathering of a T/3.2 lens, requiring brighter lighting conditions from the environment to compensate.

See also
 List of third-party E-mount lenses
 Minolta STF 135mm f/2.8 T4.5
 Sony FE 100mm F2.8 STF GM OSS

References

Camera lenses introduced in 2016
E-mount lenses
EF-mount lenses